Pavle Grubješić (Serbian Cyrillic: Пaвлe Гpубjeшић; 12 March 1953 – 23 January 1999) was a Serbian footballer.

His son Nikola Grubješić is also a football player. While playing for Partizan, Pavle held the nickname of Brzi Gonzalez which in Serbian means Speedy Gonzales.

References

External sources
 Profile at Playerhistory 

1953 births
1999 deaths
Sportspeople from Šabac
Serbian footballers
Yugoslav footballers
FK Partizan players
Grazer AK players
Yugoslav First League players
Austrian Football Bundesliga players
Serbian expatriate footballers
Expatriate footballers in Austria
Association football midfielders